Jean Chastanié (24 July 1875 in Lorient – 14 April 1948 in Paris) was an early twentieth century French middle-distance athlete who specialized in 2500 metres steeplechase. He participated in Athletics at the 1900 Summer Olympics in Paris and won the bronze medal in the 2500 metre event. He also won the silver medal in the 5000 metre team race for the French distance team, as well as taking fourth place in the 4000 metre steeplechase.

References

External links

1875 births
1948 deaths
Sportspeople from Lorient
French male middle-distance runners
Olympic silver medalists for France
Olympic bronze medalists for France
Olympic athletes of France
Athletes (track and field) at the 1900 Summer Olympics
French male steeplechase runners
Medalists at the 1900 Summer Olympics
Olympic silver medalists in athletics (track and field)
Olympic bronze medalists in athletics (track and field)
19th-century French people
20th-century French people